"Ride" is a song written by Michael Davey, Andrew Dorff and Chris Robbins, and recorded by American country music singer Martina McBride.  It was released in November 2008 as the first single from her album Shine, produced by her and Dann Huff.

Content
"Ride" is an up-tempo song with a motivational theme. In it, the narrator uses a roller coaster as a metaphor for life.

Critical reception
The song received a "thumbs down" from Engine 145 reviewer Juli Thanki, who commented that "though catchy, [the song] is a little low on cogency–not to mention originality." She also criticized it for being a "message song" in the line of McBride's other 2000s releases. She did, however, make note of McBride's vocal performance, saying that it showed emotion and was not reliant on "overly dramatic belting". Kevin Coyne of Country Universe, however, gave the song an A− rating. His review also describes McBride's vocal performance favorably: "McBride gives the song a straightforward performance that’s rough around the edges in all of the right ways."

"Ride" was nominated for Female Video of the Year in the 2009 CMT Music Awards.

Music video
The music video for "Ride" was directed by Kristin Barlowe, and was released on February 2, 2009. In the video, people are seen looking up at Martina McBride's video on a rooftop billboard. On the billboard, Martina McBride is shown performing her song into a microphone in front of a green screen as high-speed images of weather elements and traffic cycle behind her. This excites the pedestrians, and they begin dancing, jumping on cars, and enjoy themselves.

The video was ranked number 41 on GAC's Top 50 Videos of the Year.

Chart performance
"Ride" debuted on the Hot Country Songs chart at number 43 in November 2008. The song peaked at number 11 in April 2009, just missing the Top 10.

Year-end charts

References

2008 singles
2008 songs
Martina McBride songs
Song recordings produced by Dann Huff
RCA Records singles
Songs written by Andrew Dorff